So Solid Crew are a British UK garage and hip hop collective originating from the area on and surrounding the Winstanley and York Road Estates in Battersea, London which achieved wide success in the early 2000s. The group consisted of many members, the most notable being Asher D (Ashley Walters), Lisa Maffia, Harvey and Romeo. So Solid have been credited for being pioneers in the UK music scene. By turning UK garage from a dancey-genre to one that was darker and more MC-oriented, and gaining mainstream success, they inspired London youth to experiment with their own darker sounds, leading to what would become known as grime music.

Members
So Solid Crew is a large group which has expanded from 19 initial members to 30.

Confirmed members

A.M. SNiPER
AC Burrell
Akira
Asher D
Carl Morgan 
Dan Da Man
DJ Mex
DJ PDS
DJ Swiss
Face
Frost
G-Man 
JD
Kaish
Kowdeen
Lisa Maffia
MC Harvey 
MC Mac
Megaman
Money
Mr. Shabz
Oxide & Neutrino
PDs
Radical
Romeo
Skat D
Stampede
Statix
Squami
Synth
Thug Angel
Tiger S
Timeless
The Twins
Trigga
TW7
There was also a sub-group of So Solid called So Solid Kids, which contained members Samantha, Skip, Frost, and Thrust. Skip and Frost hosted a 'So Solid Kids' show on Delight FM.

Background
Before breaking into the mainstream market, So Solid Crew were involved with many pirate radio stations in London, such as Supreme FM and Delight FM. It was at Delight where they made their name, occupying most of the Sunday schedule, the so-called "So Solid Sundays". From around lunchtime until 10 pm, there were shows from different members, where the various So Solid Crew DJs would play 2-step garage tracks. At times, the So Solid Crew emcees would rap on top of tracks for up to two hours each session. On Christmas Day in 2001, So Solid Crew performed their last Sunday show on the station.

History
So Solid Crew's first album, They Don't Know, was released in October 2001, followed by a remix album entitled Fuck It in December 2001. Their hit singles include "Oh No (Sentimental Things)" and "21 Seconds", the latter reaching number one on the UK Singles Chart in August 2001. Another hit, "They Don't Know", reached number three in November 2001 and "Haters" got to number eight in January 2002. "Ride wid Us" was less successful (UK number 19 in April 2002). They released the single "Broken Silence" in 2003 which was their fourth and final top 10 hit. The song spoke out about government prejudice which they felt they had faced.

In 2002, they were the subject of the Channel 4 television documentary This Is So Solid directed and narrated by David Upshal, later released on DVD by Universal along with a live performance. Members Harvey, Romeo and Lisa Maffia have all appeared on the Channel 4 celebrity reality show The Games. In 2012, Romeo and Harvey each appeared in a separate series of Celebrity Big Brother, in the 9th and 10th series respectively; they both finished in sixth place in their respective series. The band's former producer, Carl Morgan, was convicted of murder in October 2005. Group member Dwayne Vincent (Megaman) was also accused but was cleared after a retrial.

Harvey has gone solo and has produced tracks such as "We Ride" with Doom Man, Swiss, JME and Skepta. So Solid Crew MC Asher D went on to have an acting career appearing in 50 Cent's Get Rich or Die Tryin' and in the British films Bullet Boy and Life and Lyrics, while still making independent mixtapes and albums in the grime and UK hip hop scene.

So Solid member Swiss released "Cry" featuring Sharifa.

Trigger is now working with UK/US based producer Clyde Ward on his solo project JAX and featured on UK-based band The Fallen's debut album track, "Maybe".

In February 2013, the group announced its 2013 tour.

Also in 2013, Harvey and Asher D appeared alongside many other garage pioneers in a documentary exploring the legacy of UK garage, Rewind 4Ever: The History of UK Garage.

Discography

Studio albums

Compilations and mixtapes
2000 – MC Harvey and DJ Swiss of So Solid Crew Present UK Garage Mafia
2001 – Fuck It
2006 – The Time Is Now
2006 – Roll Deep Presents Grimey Vol. 1
2011 – So Solid Lost Tapes (Garage) Vol. 1
2011 – So Solid Lost Tapes (RNB) Vol. 2

Singles

References

External links
 Official page on Myspace
NME.com So Solid Crew Page

 
English hip hop groups
Musical groups from the London Borough of Wandsworth
Musical groups established in 1998
UK garage groups
Hip hop collectives
Brit Award winners
Independiente Records artists
Relentless Records artists